Neviano is a town and comune in the Italian province of Lecce in the Apulia region of south-east Italy.

Twin towns
 Langenthal (Switzerland)

References

Cities and towns in Apulia
Localities of Salento